Melaleuca bracteosa is a low, spreading shrub in the myrtle family, Myrtaceae and is endemic to the south-west of Western Australia. It has tiny, fleshy, non-prickly leaves and cream flowerheads.

Description 

The flowers are usually bright cream coloured but sometimes white or mauve-pink. The stamens are arranged in five bundles around the flower, each bundle containing 3 to 8 stamens.

Taxonomy and naming
This species was first formally described in 1847 by the Russian botanist Nikolai Turczaninow in Bulletin de la classe physico-mathematique de l'Academie Imperiale des sciences de Saint-Petersburg. The specific epithet (bracteosa) is from the Latin bractea, meaning bract, referring to the persistent bracts of the flowers.

Distribution and habitat
This melaleuca occurs from the Pingrup district south to Albany and east to Ravensthorpe in the Avon Wheatbelt, Esperance Plains, Jarrah Forest and Mallee biogeographic regions. It grows in sand, loam or clay on winter-wet flats or plains often under low trees or tall shrubs.

Conservation status
Melaleuca bracteosa is classified as "not threatened" by the Government of Western Australia Department of Parks and Wildlife.

Uses

Essential oils
This species produces sesquiterpene oils at a rate of 0.3% (weight for weight) from fresh leaves.

References

bracteosa
Myrtales of Australia
Plants described in 1847
Rosids of Western Australia
Endemic flora of Western Australia
Taxa named by Nikolai Turczaninow